Alessandro Marangoni (born 1979) is an Italian classical pianist.

He studied piano with Marco Vincenzi, and, after a diploma summa cum laude, continued his studies at the Scuola di Musica di Fiesole with Maria Tipo. He also studied philosophy, graduating from the Università di Pavia with honors with a thesis about Fernando Liuzzi's philosophy of music.

Marangoni has won a number of awards, both in his native Italy and abroad, including, in 2007, the prestigious Amici di Milano International Prize for Music. He has performed in many European countries, and in the United States, as a soloist and as a member of chamber groups. He has worked with many of Italy's leading musicians, including Mario Ancillotti, Aldo Ceccato, Valentina Cortese, Quirino Principe, the Nuovo Quartetto Italiano and Carlo Zardo. Marangoni has also performed more than one hundred concerts on Second Life, under his avatar Benito Flores.

He has recorded music by composers such as Rossini, Muzio Clementi, and Liszt, for the Naxos record label.

Marangoni teaches piano and chamber music in master classes in Europe and South America.

References

External links
 Alessandro Marangoni's web site
 Alessandro Marangoni's blog
 Marangoni's biography on the Naxos web site

Italian classical pianists
Male classical pianists
Italian male pianists
1979 births
Living people
Place of birth missing (living people)
21st-century classical pianists
21st-century Italian male musicians